Aoi Yoru (literally "Blue Night") is an X Japan live DVD  released on July 25, 2007. It contains the band's performance at the Tokyo Dome on December 30, 1994. A DVD containing the concert from the following night (Shiroi Yoru) was released on the same day, along with a limited edition, containing both concerts and additional material (see Aoi Yoru Shiroi Yoru Complete Edition).

Track listing
Disc one
 "Amethyst (S.E.)"
 "X"
 "Joker"
 "Dahlia"
 "Scars on Melody"
 "Week End"
 "Standing Sex"
 "Heath Solo"
 "Yoshiki Drum Solo"
 "hide no Heya with Pata"
 "Say Anything featuring Toshi"
 "Rose of Pain featuring Toshi, hide, Pata"
Disc two
 "Yoshiki Piano Solo"
 "Kurenai"
 "Endless Rain"
 "Celebration"
 "Orgasm"
 "Rusty Nail"
 "Longing ~Togireta Melody~"
 "Tears (S.E.)"
 "Say Anything (S.E.)"

References

X Japan video albums
2007 video albums
Live video albums
X Japan live albums
2007 live albums